During the 1953–54 English football season, Brentford competed in the Football League Second Division. With Brentford in the relegation places, player-manager Tommy Lawton transferred out of the club in September 1953 and his replacement Bill Dodgin Sr. was unable to turn things round, which culminated in relegation to the Third Division South on the final day of the season. Brentford would not play again in the second-tier of English football until the 1992–93 season.

Season summary 
Without a transfer budget to speak of, Brentford player-manager Tommy Lawton could not rely entirely on filling his squad with the products of Alf Bew's youth team, which had reached the semi-finals of the inaugural FA Youth Cup during the previous season. Lawton again relied on Wally Bragg and Ken Coote to hold two of the half back berths alongside Tony Harper. He signed ageing forwards Frank Broome and Ian McPherson from his previous club Notts County as replacements for Les Smith and the injured Jimmy D'Arcy.

Six defeats and just one win from the opening 9 Second Division matches saw Tommy Lawton quit the club in favour of a £10,000 move to Arsenal, a transfer which saw James Robertson arrive at Griffin Park in part-exchange. Full back Fred Monk took over as caretaker manager until the appointment of Bill Dodgin Sr. on 1 October 1953. Dodgin's arrival heralded three consecutive wins, which lifted the Bees out of the relegation places. Ineffective forwards Broome and McPherson were transferred out and replaced by Cardiff City's Johnny Rainford and Frank Dudley. Despite their arrivals, Brentford showed poor form over the Christmas and New Year period and a money-raising FA Cup run ended in a third round replay defeat to Hull City. Gerry Gazzard arrived on loan from West Ham United in January 1954 and despite Gazzard and Dudley forming something of a strike partnership during the final 10 weeks of the season, Brentford were relegated in 21st-place after the club's final match on 24 April.

The solitary away league win during the season tied the club record for fewest league wins in a season. In addition, Brentford were the joint-lowest scorers in the Second Division during the season. Long-serving trainer Jack Cartmell retired at the end of the season, after over 30 years at Griffin Park as a player and a member of staff.

League table

Results
Brentford's goal tally listed first.

Legend

Football League Second Division

FA Cup

 Sources: 100 Years Of Brentford, Statto, 11v11

Playing squad 
Players' ages are as of the opening day of the 1953–54 season.

 Sources: 100 Years Of Brentford, Timeless Bees

Coaching staff

Tommy Lawton (19 August – September 1953)

Fred Monk (September – 1 October 1953)

Bill Dodgin Sr. (1 October 1953 – 24 April 1954)

Statistics

Appearances and goals

Players listed in italics left the club mid-season.
Source: 100 Years Of Brentford

Goalscorers 

Players listed in italics left the club mid-season.
Source: 100 Years Of Brentford

Management

Summary

Transfers & loans

Notes

References 

Brentford F.C. seasons
Brentford